Øksfjordbotn is a village in Loppa Municipality in Troms og Finnmark county, Norway. The village is located at the end of the Øksfjorden very close to the border with Alta Municipality.

References

Villages in Finnmark
Loppa
Populated places of Arctic Norway